Jairo Avila Jr. (born May 11, 1995) is a Colombian-American professional stock car racing driver. He last competed part-time in the NASCAR Xfinity Series, driving the No. 02 Chevrolet Camaro for Our Motorsports and the No. 99 Toyota Supra for B. J. McLeod Motorsports.

Racing career

NASCAR Xfinity Series
Avila made his NASCAR Xfinity Series debut in 2018. He drove the No. 78 Chevrolet for B. J. McLeod Motorsports at Bristol Motor Speedway, where he finished 20th after starting 27th. He returned to the team for the Kansas Speedway race, driving the No. 8 Chevrolet instead. He finished 18th after starting 32nd.

In 2019, Avila drove the No. 99 Chevrolet for B. J. McLeod Motorsports at Las Vegas. He finished 25th after starting 24th.

Avila joined Our Motorsports in June 2020, driving the No. 02 in the second race at Homestead–Miami Speedway. Brett Moffitt had driven the car in the weekend's first event, with the driver switch meaning Avila had to start at the rear.

NASCAR K&N Pro Series West
Avila made his NASCAR debut in the NASCAR K&N Pro Series West in 2014, driving the No. 39 Ford at the Stateline Speedway race. He finished 7th after starting 11th. Afterwards, he ran the next four races, in the No. 38 Chevrolet/Ford at Colorado and Evergreen, and the No. 36 Ford/Toyota at Iowa and Kern County Raceway Park.

NASCAR K&N Pro Series East
Avila ran the first 11 races in the 2016 NASCAR K&N Pro Series East season. He drove the No. 42 Toyota for Rev Racing. He had an average start of 14th and an average finish of 16th throughout the season.

ARCA Racing Series
In 2015, Avila participated in two ARCA Racing Series races. He drove the No. 58 Ford at Pocono, finishing 16th after starting 25th. He then drove the No. 36 Ford at Kansas, finishing 10th after starting 15th.

Motorsports career results

NASCAR
(key) (Bold – Pole position awarded by qualifying time. Italics – Pole position earned by points standings or practice time. * – Most laps led.)

Xfinity Series

K&N Pro Series East

K&N Pro Series West

ARCA Racing Series
(key) (Bold – Pole position awarded by qualifying time. Italics – Pole position earned by points standings or practice time. * – Most laps led.)

References

External links
 

Living people
1995 births
NASCAR drivers
Racing drivers from California
Racing drivers from Los Angeles
Sportspeople from Alhambra, California
American sportspeople of Colombian descent
ARCA Menards Series drivers